is a women in prison film made by Toei Company in 1973. The fourth, and last in the first Female Prisoner Scorpion series, Meiko Kaji returned to play the title role, but director Shunya Itō was replaced by Yasuharu Hasebe.

Plot
Nami Matsushima is found in a wedding chapel by police led by detective Hirose. They handcuff her, but she is able to escape. Kudo, a worker in a sex show club, rescues her. He is a radical with a history of problems with the police. One of the women from the sex show, who had unsuccessfully tried to seduce Kudo, finds Nami's handcuffs in Kudo's things, and informs the police. The police arrest and beat Kudo and then release and tail him back to Nami's hiding place.

Nami is captured and sentenced to death. Just before her execution, Nami is allowed to escape by a warden who cooperating with the police to set up Nami. Nami is taken to a gallows outside the prison where Hirose plans to hang her. She beats Hirose and he ends up hanged instead of her. Nami kills Kudo.

Cast
Meiko Kaji as Nami Matsushima, the Scorpion
Masakazu Tamura as Teruo Kudo 
Yumi Kanei as Kodama
Hiroshi Tsukata as Hirose
Yayoi Watanabe as Midori
Sanae Nakahara as Akiko
Akemi Negishi as Minamura

Release

Home video
#701's Grudge Song was first released on DVD for Region 1 by Tokyo Shock on April 25, 2005. UK home video company Arrow Films will release the film on Blu-ray on July 26, 2016 within a box-set containing the first four films of the Female Prisoner Scorpion series. Limited to 3000 copies, the box set will contain new 2K restorations of all four films included in the set as well as numerous special features, with #701's Grudge Song including a new filmed appreciation by director Kazuyoshi Kumakiri (Kichiku: Battle of the Beasts), a new interview with film critic Jasper Sharp, an archival interview with director Yasuharu Hasebe, a new video essay about the film series by critic Tom Mes, and the theatrical trailer of the film.

Sequels
Director Yutaka Kohira revived the series for two more episodes in 1976 and 1977. Evil Dead Trap (1988) director, Toshiharu Ikeda filmed the original story again for V-Cinema in 1991.

References

Bibliography

External links

1970s crime thriller films
1973 films
Female Convict Scorpion series
Live-action films based on manga
Films directed by Yasuharu Hasebe
1970s Japanese-language films
Toei Company films
Women in prison films
Japanese prison films
1970s prison drama films
1970s Japanese films